Arnórsson may refer to:

Einar Arnórsson (1880–1955), Icelandic politician, lawyer and law professor
Haukur Arnórsson (born 1971), Icelandic alpine skier
Kolbeinn ungi Arnórsson (1208–1245), Icelandic chieftain or goði of the Ásbirningar family clan
Þjóðólfr Arnórsson, 11th-century Icelandic skáld, court poet to the Norwegian kings Magnus the Good and Harald Hardrada

See also
Arnarson